Museums and Digital Culture (2019), edited by Tula Giannini and Jonathan P. Bowen, who are also the authors of 12 chapters, is an interdisciplinary book about developments in digital culture with respect to museums.

Overview
The book is divided into nine parts and 28 contributed chapters by a variety of authors. The book includes a foreword by Loïc Tallon, co-editor of the 2008 book Digital Technologies and the Museum Experience. There is also a preface, list of contributors and abbreviations, and an index. The book is available in hardcover and electronic ( and ) versions. The book is part of the Springer Series on Cultural Computing, edited by Ernest Edmonds. The book was launched at the EVA London 2019 Conference.

Parts
The book is divided into the following parts:

 Introduction
 Philosophy and Theory
 Exhibitions
 Collections
 Audiences
 Digital Artists
 Education
 Libraries and Archives
 Digital Future

Contributors
The following authors contributed to chapters in the book:

 Rachel Ara (London)
 Stefania Boiano (InvisibleStudio)
 Ann Borda (The University of Melbourne)
 Jonathan P. Bowen (London South Bank University)
 Stephen J. Bury (The Frick Collection)
 Seb Chan (Australian Centre for the Moving Image)
 Catherine Devine (Microsoft)
 Sara Devine (Brooklyn Museum)
 Douglas Dodds (Victoria and Albert Museum)
 Stuart Dunn (King's College London)
 Graeme Earl (King's College London)
 Ernest Edmonds (De Montfort University)
 Tom Ensom (Tate Gallery)
 Patrícia Falcão (Tate Gallery)
 Rosanna Flouty (New York University)
 Anna Foka (Uppsala University & Umeå University)
 Francesca Franco (University of Exeter)
 Giuliano Gaia (InvisibleStudio)
 Carla Gannis (Pratt Institute)
 Tula Giannini (Pratt Institute)
 Courtney Johnston (Museum of New Zealand Te Papa Tongarewa)
 Nick Lambert (Ravensbourne University London)
 Andy Lomas (Goldsmiths, University of London)
 Ross Parry (University of Leicester)
 Gareth Polmeer (Royal College of Art)
 Judith Siefring (Bodleian Libraries, University of Oxford)
 Matt Tarr (American Museum of Natural History)
 Deborah Turnbull Tillman (University of New South Wales & New Media Curation)
 Bruce Wands (School of Visual Arts, New York City)
 Will Wootton (King's College London)

Reviews
The book has been reviewed in the following journals:

 Museum Management and Curatorship.
 MedieKultur: Journal of Media and Communication Research.
 MIDAS: Museus e Estudios Interdisciplares.
 Journal of Cultural Management and Cultural Policy.

The book is indexed by DBLP. There is a Master of Science (M.S.) in Museums and Digital Culture (MDC) at the Pratt Institute in the School of Information.

See also
 Digital Technologies and the Museum Experience (2008)

References

External links
Springer information
Amazon USA information
Amazon UK information

2019 non-fiction books
2019 in Internet culture
Springer Science+Business Media books
Museum books
Technology books
Books about visual art
Books about the sociology of education
Philosophy books
Museum informatics
Museum education
Digital humanities
Digital technology
Digital art
Education issues
Social issues
Library science
Archival science
Pratt Institute